Hysterics is the debut album by Rolo Tomassi recorded in spring 2008 and released on 22 September 2008.  The album is Rolo Tomassi's first release on Hassle Records and features all new tracks. The album received an exclusive first review from Thrash Hits, who awarded the album a maximum score. The band recorded a video for the song "I Love Turbulence" on 15 September.

The album was also released on heavyweight black vinyl, featuring alternative artwork, through Hassle Records and limited to only 1000 copies. The album is being repressed through Holy Roar/Destination Moon Records in two colours, Red/Clear and Blue with Yellow and Grey splatter.

On 23 November 2009, a "Bonus Disk" version of the album was released via Shock Records in Australia.

Track listing 
 "Oh, Hello Ghost" – 3:33
 "I Love Turbulence" – 2:48
 "Fofteen" – 2:45
 "Abraxas" – 2:26
 "An Apology to the Universe" – 1:18
 "Nine" – 4:03
 "Macabre Charade" – 3:48
 "Trojan Measures" – 1:00
 "Everything Went Grey" – 3:29
 "Scabs" – 4:31
 "Fantasia" – 14:21

Bonus disk track listing 
 "Digital History"
 "Beatrotter"
 "Fuck the Pleasantries, Let's Rock"
 "Apocalypso"
 "Rock the Pleasantries, Let's Fuck"

References 

2008 debut albums
Rolo Tomassi albums
Hassle Records albums